Corinne Drewery (born 21 September 1959) is an English singer-songwriter and fashion designer, best known for being the lead vocalist of the band Swing Out Sister.

Early life
Drewery was born and grew up in Nottingham. She later moved to the Lincolnshire village of Authorpe and went to South Reston Primary School, then Monks' Dyke High School and King Edward VI Grammar School in nearby Louth, then Lincoln College. She grew up on the classic pop standards, since her father played in a band which was regular support to big stars like Tom Jones and Sandie Shaw. She was strongly influenced by Northern soul, visiting performances at the Winter Gardens in Cleethorpes, and referred to Northern soul tracks during an extensive interview on BBC Radio Nottingham. Her mother Elaine Drewery, also a former singer, is the founder of Hedgehog Care in Authorpe. Her brother Anton was also a singer and musician. His debut studio album With a Little Help was released posthumously in August 2022, six months after his untimely death.

Music
Drewery moved to London after leaving school in 1976 to study fashion at the Central Saint Martins College of Art and Design and eventually became a fashion designer. But she also sang for short periods with bands such as Working Week.

She first met Andy Connell and Martin Jackson in 1984 and together they formed Swing Out Sister. In 1986–87 the group achieved chart success on both sides of the Atlantic with "Breakout". This became the band's signature song and was by far their most successful hit.

Apart from singing the lead vocals in the band, Drewery is the band's lyricist, and participates in the composing of the songs with her musical partner Connell.

In 1986, she provided additional vocals on the track "Bootsy" by Connell's former band A Certain Ratio; the song was released exclusively as a single in Australia and featured on their fifth studio album Force.

In 2022, she provided guest co-lead vocals with Ryan Bland of Ache, for the 24-7 Spyz track "Angels & Demons."

References

External links
Official Swing Out Sister website
Swing Out Sister – the Swinging Website

1959 births
Living people
Swing Out Sister members
English women pop singers
English contraltos
English songwriters
Musicians from Nottinghamshire
People from Nottingham
People educated at King Edward VI Grammar School, Louth
21st-century English women singers
21st-century English singers
Musicians from Lincolnshire
Sophisti-pop musicians